The history of Jews in Thailand began in the 17th century with the arrival of Baghdadi Jewish families.

History
The Jewish community of Thailand today is mostly made up of the Ashkenazi descendants of refugees from Russia and the Soviet Union. There are also Persian Jews who emigrated during the 1970s and 1980s to escape the Iranian Revolution.

The country's permanent Jewish community, with over 1,000 members, is mainly located in Bangkok (especially in the Khaosan Road area). There are also small groups of Jews with synagogues in Phuket, Chiang Mai and Ko Samui. During Jewish holidays, they are joined by vacationing Jews, especially from Israel and the United States. 

Thailand has had friendly diplomatic relations with Israel since 1954. At the request of two of Bangkok's synagogues, Beth Elisheva and Even Chen, Rabbi Yosef Chaim Kantor took up residence as the first permanent rabbi in Bangkok, in 1993. He has been in Thailand since 1993 (when the Jewish Association of Thailand was founded), and is a member of Chabad. He was joined in 1995 by Rabbi Nechemya Wilhelm, also of Chabad.

Chabad 
Chabad of Bangkok is a small Chabad House in Bangkok, catering primarily to young Israeli tourists. It was an important center of disaster relief after the 2004 tsunami. It serves Sabbath meals to hundreds of Jewish travelers every week, including during Jewish religious festivals such as Passover. Due to security concerns in the aftermath of the 2008 Mumbai attacks, entry is restricted to the Jewish community.

Jewish education
A complete range of Jewish education services is available in Bangkok, from kindergarten through high school. This includes a recently opened Orthodox yeshiva. After years of government refusal, permission has also been granted for the establishment of a Jewish cemetery next to the Bangkok Protestant Cemetery in Bang Kho Laem.

References

External links
 Jewish Community of Thailand 

Jews
Jews
Thailand
Jews and Judaism in Thailand
Thailand